Shufersal, formerly Super-Sol in English and Shufra-Sal in Hebrew, commonly known as Super-sal, is the largest supermarket chain in Israel, with a 20% market share (as of 2018). The company, which was established in 1958, was the first to implement the American supermarket model in Israel

As of October 2021, Shufersal had 301 stores in total, and 90 branches of Be Drugstores Ltd. The company employs 17,000 employees. It also engages in commercial real estate. 

Shufersal shares are traded on the Tel Aviv Stock Exchange, and it is a constituent of the TA-125 Index.

History

Shufersal was founded in 1958 by a group of grocers from Detroit, Michigan.  Nate Lurie of Southfield, Michigan was a co-Founder and served as the first Chairman of the Board. The name was originally a portmanteau of the Aramaic *shufra* שופרא, meaning "premium" and *sal* סל, Hebrew for "basket". In 2005, the company implemented a strategic growth plan, creating three supermarket categories: "Shufersal Deal", "Shufersal Big", and "Shufersal Sheli". 

In early 2006, Shufersal purchased the third-largest retail chain in Israel, Clubmarket. In October 2006, the chain launched the Shufersal Credit Card. Sales turnover for the chain in 2007 totaled NIS 9,935 million.

In 2009 it launched a subsidiary, Yesh, targeting the Haredi market. Features of Yesh stores include products marketed to larger families, lower prices, stricter kashrut standards, and in some stores, separate hours for men and women In 2009, Shufersal was threatened with an antitrust suit for the purchase of Clubmarket.

Shufersal label
Shufersals sells more than 1,300 store brand products in its stores. In 2011, the company had 59 supermarket branches in Jerusalem.

Services
Shufersal also markets its products through a computerized telephone marketing center for shopping by phone, fax, or the internet.

See also
Hatzi Hinam 
Rami Levy Hashikma Marketing
List of companies operating in West Bank settlements

References

Ariel Zilber song בחברה להגנת הטבע beChevrah leHaganat haTeva, pronounced "supersol"

External links

Official website 

Retail companies established in 1958
Companies listed on the Tel Aviv Stock Exchange
Supermarkets of Israel
Food and drink companies of Israel
Israeli brands
1958 establishments in Israel